Hafting is a process by which an artifact, often bone, stone, or metal is attached to a haft (handle or strap). This makes the artifact more useful by allowing it to be shot (arrow), thrown by hand (spear), or used with more effective leverage (axe). When constructed properly, hafting can tremendously improve a weapon's damage and range. It is estimated that hafted weapons were most common during the Upper Paleolithic and Middle Paleolithic. It was one of the first tools where hominins took separate elements and united them into a single tool. The development of hafting is considered by archaeologists to have been a significant milestone. It was not only an improvement in the technology at the time; it also showed the progression of the human mind toward a world of complex tool-making.

Hafting weapons is perhaps best known for its use by humans in prehistory, but it is still practiced by enthusiasts today and the handle of a tool such as an axe is still known as a haft. Many people still practice the hafting techniques by using old-fashioned methods to figure out the best way to attach a handle onto tools, while improving the overall structure and function. Hafting has evolved through the past and the idea can still be seen in the structure of modern-day tools such as hammers and axes. The evolution of hand tools would be greatly altered had the people of our past failed to invent the idea of hafting. The methods and processes of hafting have also varied and evolved over time.

The hafting process

Hafting requires a means of attaching the artifact to the strap or shaft, and to this end, flanges are often created on one end (the end opposite the cutting edge). Flanges are produced by a process of knapping or grinding the excess stone away, resulting in indentations in the piece.

If a shaft or handle is to be used, it must also be prepared in some way. Wood is frequently used (in the US, commonly Bigleaf Maple (Acer macrophyllum) due to its soft structure that eases chipping away at the end of the shaft to which the tool is to be affixed. A good piece of wood has a diameter large enough to provide adequate strength yet small enough to hold comfortably for long periods of time. A common practice of hafting is to remove the outer layer of bark where the handhold would be to prevent cuts and the painful imperfections found in the bark. Attaching the tool to the shaft can be difficult which is why there are two main methods used to soften the wooden shaft including burning the end, and/or soaking it in water. These soften the material to easily allow the slits to be cut vertically into the center of the shaft. This provides a place for the "head" of the tool or weapon to fit. Alternatively, the shaft may be split down the center which allows the artifact to fully sit within the shaft, and once fully wrapped up, can be much stronger.

The artifact can then be inserted into the slit and fixed to the shaft by tying around the flanges with a suitable material. Materials such as the Australian Sea Grass Cordage and split deer intestine can be used due to its high strength and durability once installed. Some people will wrap the material around the handle as well to add grip. The main disadvantage of wrapping the tool onto the shaft arises after usage when the fibers lose their tension and become loose. High humidity is also a contributing factor to the fibers losing tension. On occasion, glue is added for extra support. When glue or any other resin is used, the hafting is said to be mastic. Mastic hafts are also very strong and reliable since there is little to no movement of the tool. Glue also has the advantage of absorbing shock when hardened, which helps with cushioning. Before industrial glue was readily available, people would use a variety of plant or animal materials to make glue. Many prehistoric types of glue were a combination of materials, such as animal feces, tree bark, and charcoal. The main downside of mastic hafts is the time consuming and difficult construction process. Alternatively, the head may simply be forced into the shaft, if the shaft is soft enough, eliminating the need for a slit (and perhaps improving durability). If a strap is used, it is tied directly to the flanges of the artifact.

Generally, it takes a much longer time to create the actual haft binding than it does the tool used in the half. The tool, such as a projectile point, typically takes up to twenty minutes whereas the haft binding takes several hours. Often many times throughout a haft's life cycle, the tool will be replaced or sharpened and reattached to the shaft to keep the haft as effective and precise as possible.

Hafting in prehistory

More than 125,000 years ago, early Archaic humans such as Homo heidelbergensis developed the extensive use of hafted stone tools. Over time, hafting evolved and tools became deadlier with more control. Evolution has brought hafts with small shafts and dull stone tools to longer stronger shafts with sharper, narrower tools that were better suited for piercing and cutting. In much more recent times, hafted axes and weapons have benefited from tapering. By offsetting the diameters of a tool with a cylindrical base, and a hole in the shaft, a much more secure fit can be made, assuring the ax head stays in place. Hafting stone points, in particular, was an important advancement in the weapons of early humans. These hafted stone points increased the force and effectiveness of these tools, therefore, allowing people to hunt and kill animals more efficiently. The increased efficiency of hunting and killing animals is believed to have allowed for people of this time to have regular access to meat and other high-quality foods. The increase in the consumption of meat around this time could be directly linked to increases in brain size that are reported in the archaeology record of this time.

Multiple lines of evidence indicate that ~500,000-year-old stone points from the archaeological site of Kathu Pan 1 (KP1), South Africa, functioned as spear tips.
This has led teams of researchers to come to the conclusion that common ancestors of Homo sapiens and Neanderthals started hafting almost 500,000 years ago.

See also
 Knapping
 Projectile point

References

Further reading
 Keeley, Lawrence H. Hafting and Retooling: Effects on the Archaeological Record. N.p.: Society for American Archaeology, 1982. Print.
 "Hafting a Stone Blade the Old-Fashioned Way Page 1." Hafting a Stone Blade. N.p., n.d. Web. 18 Nov. 2013.
 
 Rots, Veerle. Prehension and hafting traces on flint tools a methodology. Leuven: Leuven University Press, 2010. Print. 
 VN, Sreeja. "Oldest Stone-Tipped Spears Found; Early Humans Started Hafting 500,000 Years Ago." International Business Times. IB Media Inc., Nov. 2012. Web. 18 Nov. 2013.

 Primitive technology